Gymnusa grandiceps is a species of rove beetle in the family Staphylinidae. It is found in North America.

References

Further reading

External links

 

Aleocharinae
Articles created by Qbugbot
Beetles described in 1915